Sheridan Grosvenor (born 27 July 1978) is a Barbadian footballer who played during the 2014 FIFA World Cup qualification. He plays as a defender.

References

External links
 

1978 births
Living people
Association football defenders
Barbadian footballers
Barbados international footballers
Place of birth missing (living people)
21st-century Barbadian people